The 2017 World Modern Pentathlon Championships were held in Cairo, Egypt from 21 to 29 August 2017. The events include pistol shooting, fencing, 200m swimming, show jumping and a 3 km run.

Medal summary

Men

Women

Mixed

Medal table

References

World Modern Pentathlon Championships
International sports competitions hosted by Egypt
Modern pentathlon in Africa
Sports competitions in Cairo
World
World Modern Pentathlon Championships